The Australian Imperial Force included a range of different engineer units including field units, signals, mining, works, railway, survey and training units.

Field units
 1st Division Engineers 
 1st Field Company
2nd Field Company
3rd Field Company
 2nd Divisional Engineers
 5th Field Company
 6th Field Company
 7th Field Company
 3rd Divisional Engineers 
 9th Field Company
 10th Field Company
11th Field Company
 4th Divisional Engineers
 4th Field Company
 12th Field Company
 13th Field Company
 5th Divisional Engineers
 8th Field Company
 14th Field Company
15th Field Company
 6th Division Engineers (disbanded following formation in 1917)
 16th Field Company
 17th Field Company
 ANZAC Mounted Division Engineers
 1st Field Squadron
 Australian Mounted Divisional Engineers
 2nd Field Squadron
 Desert Mounted Corps Troops Engineers
 'D' Field Troop and Bridging Train

Signal units
 1st Division Signal Company
 2nd Divisional Signal Company
 3rd Divisional Signal Company
 4th Division Signal Company
 5th Divisional Signal Company
 Australian Corps Signal Company
 1st Signal Squadron
 2nd Signal Squadron
 Australian Pack Wireless Section
 1st Australian Wireless Signal Squadron
 Cavalry Divisional Signal Squadron

Mining units
 1st Tunnelling Company
 2nd Tunnelling Company
 3rd Tunnelling Company
 4th Tunnelling Company (absorbed by 1st Tunneling Company)
 5th Tunnelling Company (absorbed by 2nd Tunneling Company)
 6th Tunnelling Company (absorbed by 3rd Tunneling Company)
Australian Electrical and Mechanical Mining and Boring Company

Works units
 1st Army Troops Company
 Australian Corps RE Workshops

Railway units
 Headquarters Australian Railway Group
 1st Light Railway Operating Company
 2nd Light Railway Operating Company
 3rd Light Railway Operating Company
 4th Broad Gauge Railway Operating Company
 5th Broad Gauge Railway Operating Company
 6th Broad Gauge Railway Operating Company

Survey units
 Australian Corps Topographical Section

Training units
 Engineer Training Depot
 Signal Section, Engineer Training Depot
 Australian Railway Operating Division Depot
 Engineer Training Depot

Notes

References
 

Military units and formations of Australia in World War I
Engineering units and formations of Australia